Villatoro is a municipality in Spain belonging to the province of Ávila, in the autonomous community of Castile and León. In 2017 it had a population of 178 inhabitants.

References

Municipalities in the Province of Ávila